Air Vanuatu is an airline with its head office in the Air Vanuatu House, Port Vila, Vanuatu. It is Vanuatu's national flag carrier, operating to Australia, New Zealand, New Caledonia and points in the South Pacific. Its main base is Bauerfield International Airport, Port Vila.

History 

Air Vanuatu was established in early 1981 after Vanuatu gained independence from the United Kingdom and France the previous year. The assistance of Ansett Airlines was sought and a five-year agreement put in place for Ansett to provide aircraft and operating staff. Ansett also took a 40% stake in the new airline, the government of Vanuatu holding the other 60%. The first Air Vanuatu flight, a McDonnell Douglas DC-9-31 owned and operated by Ansett, departed Sydney for Port Vila on 5 September 1981. In May 1982 a Boeing 737-200 of Polynesian Airlines replaced the DC-9; this was replaced in turn by an Ansett 737-200 in October 1985. In March 1986, the agreement with Ansett expired and was not renewed, this had the effect of grounding the airline.

In 1987, the company was re-established with 100% ownership by the government of Vanuatu, after a new commercial agreement was signed with Australian Airlines; weekly Sydney – Port Vila flights re-commenced on 19 December using a Boeing 727-200 chartered from Australian. Air Vanuatu subsequently bought the aircraft in 1989 and leased it back to Australian for use on that airline's network on days that it was not used by Air Vanuatu. In November 1992 the 727 was replaced by a Boeing 737-400 leased from Australian Airlines. The following year an Embraer EMB 110 Bandeirante was also leased from Australian, entering service that April to operate flights between Port Vila and Nouméa. The leases on both aircraft continued after Australian was taken over by Qantas in October 1993, with the commercial agreement being rolled-over to Qantas as well. Qantas is deeply involved in the airline's operations to this day; Air Vanuatu uses Qantas Frequent Flyer program, Qantas codeshares on Air Vanuatu's flights from Australia, and provides maintenance and pilot training services as well.

Air Vanuatu terminated the lease on the Qantas Boeing 737-400 after it took delivery of its own Boeing 737-300 in April 1997. The same month Bandeirante services ceased when a Saab 2000 entered service. The lease on the Saab 2000 was terminated in March 1999 and in June that year Air Vanuatu commenced using a de Havilland Canada Dash 8 of Vanuatu's government-owned domestic carrier Vanair on weekly services to Nouméa. In April 2001 Air Vanuatu merged with Vanair, however the merger was reversed only five months later. In November 2003 an ATR 42 entered service for use on domestic routes in competition with Vanair. In September 2004, Air Vanuatu again merged with Vanair.

In January 2008, Air Vanuatu replaced its Boeing 737-300 with a new Boeing 737-800. Three Harbin Y-12s were added to the fleet in early 2009 and in October the same year the airline took delivery of a new ATR 72–500 aircraft to replace its ATR 42. Four days after the ATR 72 arrived at Port Vila the Board of Air Vanuatu was sacked and replaced by Directors General of various Vanuatu government ministries. The ATR 72 made its first revenue flight for Air Vanuatu on 8 November 2009. A second ATR 72–500 was delivered to the airline in November 2014.
In 2016 the Harbin Y-12s were phased out and replaced by de Havilland Canada DHC-6 Twin Otters.

In July 2020, Air Vanuatu announced a major set of changes for the airline due to the COVID-19 pandemic. With the reshuffling of Orders and the shrinking and localization of the management team. During this, the CEO Derek Nice has stepped down, being temporarily replaced by Joseph Laloyer. Until a replacement can be found. This includes delaying the delivery of the 4 A220 Family aircraft they had on order. And a strategic review of their network.

Destinations

Domestic
As of November 2009 Air Vanuatu operates 28 domestic routes throughout the country.
Malampa
 Craig Cove (Craig Cove Airport)
 Lamap (Malekoula Island Airport)
 Norsup (Norsup Airport)
 Paama (Paama Airport)
 South West Bay (South West Bay Airport)
 Ulei (Ulei Airport)
Penama
 Longana, east Ambae (Longana Airport)
 Naone, Maewo (Maewo-Naone Airport)
 Redcliffe, south Ambae (Redcliffe Airport)
 Lonorore, south Pentecost (Lonorore Airport)
 Sara, north Pentecost (Sara Airport)
 Walaha, west Ambae (Walaha Airport)
Shefa
 Émaé (Siwo Airport)
 Lamen Bay (Lamen Bay Airport)
 Tongoa (Tongoa Airport)
 Valesdir (Valesdir Airport)
Tafea
 Anatom (Anatom Airport)
 Aniwa (Aniwa Airport)
 Dillon's Bay (Dillon's Bay Airport)
 Futuna Island (Futuna Airport)
 Ipota (Ipota Airport)
 Tanna (White Grass Airport)
Torba
 Gaua (Gaua Airport)
 Mota Lava (Mota Lava Airport)
 Sola, Vanua Lava (Vanua Lava Airport)
 Torres Islands (Torres Airport)

International charter flights
Air Vanuatu Charter
As of September 2020 Air Vanuatu commenced International Charter Flights to / from the following international destinations specialising in seasonal worker, company, diplomatic and freight charters throughout the Pacific Islands, South West Pacfic, South East Asia, Asia, Australia and New Zealand. #airvanuatucharter :

International scheduled

As of January 2023 Air Vanuatu operates to the following international destinations:

Codeshare agreements
Air Vanuatu has codeshare agreements with the following airlines:

 Aircalin
 Air Niugini
 Fiji Airways
 Qantas
 Solomon Airlines

Fleet
, the Air Vanuatu fleet consists of the following aircraft:

Incidents and accidents
 19 December 2008 – a Britten-Norman Islander aircraft (Flight 261) with nine passengers crashed into a mountain near Olpoi Airport on the western side of the island of Espiritu Santo, killing the pilot and seriously injuring some passengers. The aircraft had been heading to Santo-Pekoa International Airport. The mountainous region where the aircraft crashed was shrouded in thick fog at the time.
 25 July 1991 – a Britten-Norman Islander aircraft crashed on the island of Espiritu Santo, killing all nine passengers and the pilot. The crash site was only located after a four-day search involving several helicopters. The crash was attributed to pilot error.
 28 July 2018, ATR 72 registration YJ-AV71, operating Flight 241, suffered an in-flight engine failure. On landing at Port Vila, the aircraft departed the runway and collided with two parked Britten-Norman Islander aircraft belonging to Unity Airlines and that of another company. Thirteen people sustained minor injuries.

See also
Vanair

References

External links

Air Vanuatu
Captain Bani dies saving passengers

1981 establishments in Vanuatu
Airlines established in 1981
Airlines of Vanuatu
Government-owned airlines
Port Vila